In numerical analysis, order of accuracy quantifies the rate of convergence of a numerical approximation of a differential equation to the exact solution.
Consider , the exact solution to a differential equation in an appropriate normed space . Consider a numerical approximation , where  is a parameter characterizing the approximation, such as the step size in a finite difference scheme or the diameter of the cells in a finite element method.
The numerical solution  is said to be th-order accurate if the error  is proportional to the step-size  to the th power:

Using the big O notation an th-order accurate numerical method is notated as

This definition is strictly dependent on the norm used in the space; the choice of such norm is fundamental to estimate the rate of convergence and, in general, all numerical errors correctly.

Partial differential equations which vary over both time and space are said to be accurate to order  in time and to order  in space.

References 

Numerical analysis